Mario Alberto García Covalles  (born 1 June 1967) is a Mexican former footballer and football manager. He was the manager of Atlante in the Liga de Expansión MX.

Club career
García Covalles played as a midfielder for Atlante during his whole career, from 1989 to 1997.

Managerial career
García Covalles started his managerial career as an assistant to José Guadalupe Cruz during his coaching stay with the Atlante from 2004 to 2008. In August 2008 he became the head coach of Club León obtaining the first win  of his professional career after beating C.D. Tapatío 3–1.

Honours

Manager
Atlante
Liga de Expansión MX: Apertura 2021
Campeón de Campeones: 2022

External links

References

1967 births
Living people
Mexican footballers
Association football midfielders
Atlante F.C. footballers
Liga MX players
Club León managers
Atlante F.C. managers
Mexican football managers
Footballers from Mexico City